Clark County is the name of twelve counties in the United States. Most, though not all, are named after two brothers: military hero George Rogers Clark in the Midwest, and explorer William Clark in the West.

Clark County, Arkansas
Clark County, Idaho
Clark County, Illinois
Clark County, Indiana
Clark County, Kansas
Clark County, Kentucky
Clark County, Missouri
Clark County, Nevada, the most populous county bearing the name Clark, containing Las Vegas
Clark County, Ohio
Clark County, South Dakota
Clark County, Washington
Clark County, Wisconsin

See also
Clarke County (disambiguation)
Lewis and Clark County, Montana